Herman Mihalich (August 3, 1930 – September 30, 1997) is a former Democratic member of the Pennsylvania House of Representatives.

References

Democratic Party members of the Pennsylvania House of Representatives
1930 births
1997 deaths
20th-century American politicians